Puchong Town Centre is a township under the Subang Jaya Municipal Council in Puchong, Selangor, Malaysia.

Education 
Puchong Town Centre has 2 primary schools and 1 secondary school.
Primary: 
Sekolah Kebangsaan Pusat Bandar Puchong (1)   
Sekolah Kebangsaan Pusat Bandar Puchong (2) 
Secondary:  
Sekolah Menengah Kebangsaan Pusat Bandar Puchong (1)

Townships in Selangor